Pachymorpha is a genus of phasmids belonging to the family Diapheromeridae.

The species of this genus are found in Australasia, Africa, Madagascar and tropical Asia up to southern China.

Species
The Phasmida Species File lists:
Pachymorpha arguta 
Pachymorpha belocerca 
Pachymorpha carli 
Pachymorpha congensis 
Pachymorpha darnis 
Pachymorpha epidicus 
Pachymorpha madagassa 
Pachymorpha meruensis 
Pachymorpha sansibarica 
Pachymorpha simplicipes 
Pachymorpha spinosa 
Pachymorpha squalida  = type species (as Bacillus squalidus Gray; locality Australia)
Pachymorpha staeli

References

Diapheromeridae